Artur Zapadnya (born 4 June 1990) is a Ukrainian football defender.

Career
Zapadnya made his first team debut in a Premier League match against FC Kryvbas Kryvyi Rih on 9 May 2009, and was substituted in first time. In February 2012, he signed a contract with the Ukrainian Premier League's club FC Vorskla Poltava for 1 year with possibility to extend it for one more year. In 2019 he moved to Volyn Lutsk, where he played 11 matches.

Desna Chernihiv 
In summer 2019 he signed for FC Desna Chernihiv, the main club in the city of Chernihiv in Ukrainian Premier League. With the club, he was promoted for the Europa League third qualifying round, for the first time in the history of the club. In January 2021, with agree with the club his contract was ended.

Metalist 1925 Kharkiv
On 9 January 2021 he signed for Metalist 1925 Kharkiv in Ukrainian First League. On 15 March 2021 he made his debut with the new team against Alians Lypova Dolyna in the winning match for 2-1. On 23 September 2021 he played in Ukrainian Cup against Epitsentr Dunaivtsi getting into the Round of 16 of the competition in the season 2021-22. On 22 October 2021 he scored against Inhulets Petrove in Ukrainian Premier League in the season 2021-22. In January 2022, his contract with the club was ended.

Maktaaral
In January 2022, he moved to Maktaaral in Kazakhstan Premier League.

International career
He was several times called up to the Ukraine national under-21 football team, including for the match against Malta U21 on 29 May 2010.

Honours
Metalist 1925 Kharkiv
 Ukrainian First League: 2020-21

Veres Rivne
 Ukrainian First League: 2016–17

References

External links 
Profile from Official Metalist1925 website

Ukrainian footballers
Ukraine student international footballers
Ukraine under-21 international footballers
Ukrainian expatriate footballers
FC Mariupol players
FC Vorskla Poltava players
FC Metalurh Zaporizhzhia players
PFC Sumy players
NK Veres Rivne players
FC Lviv players
FC Volyn Lutsk players
FC Desna Chernihiv players
FC Metalist 1925 Kharkiv players
Ukrainian Premier League players
Ukrainian First League players
1990 births
Living people
People from Pershotravensk
Expatriate footballers in Kazakhstan
Ukrainian expatriate sportspeople in Kazakhstan
Association football midfielders
Sportspeople from Dnipropetrovsk Oblast